North Star is an organization for believing LGBT Latter-day Saints.  Its stated mission is to "provide a place of community for Latter-day Saints who experience homosexual attraction or gender identity incongruence, as well as their family, friends, and ecclesiastical leaders." It supports the teaching of the Church of Jesus Christ of Latter-day Saints, including the law of chastity, which prohibits sexual relationships outside of a legal marriage between one man and one woman. The organization takes "no official position on the origin or mutability of homosexual attractions or gender identity incongruence", and does not "endorse political causes or join political coalitions, including those officially sanctioned by the [LDS] Church."

North Star was founded in 2007. The organization holds an annual conference in Utah, as well as quarterly events, live-streamed firesides, and other smaller events in cities around the United States. It also manages several social media discussion groups for different sexual identities and demographics.

The organization does not take a position on political issues, but has spoken out against using the suicide of gay Latter-day Saints to promote personal political agendas. Evergreen International, a similar organization, was absorbed into North Star in early 2014.

Involvement with conversion therapy

Although the organization does not officially endorse any therapy, two co-founders of North Star, Ty Mansfield (Former President) and Jeff Bennion (Former Chair of the Board of Directors), were heavily involved in People Can Change (PCC) and its Journey Into Manhood (JiM) and Journey Beyond (JB) weekends, and have allowed and participated in PCC's promotions in North Star online groups, pages, and its yearly conferences. Many prominent members and leaders of North Star (such as those featured in TLC's "My Husband's Not Gay") were involved in conversion therapy, and board members Preston Dahlgreen and Jeff Bennion defended the Jewish conversion therapy organization JONAH in the 2015 court case Ferguson v. JONAH. In September 2015, Mansfield stated that North Star no longer gives endorsements of PCC online or at conferences.

Voices of Hope project

In 2012, North Star sponsored the launch of the Voices of Hope Project to share the stories of believing LGBTQ members of the LDS Church. The site features essays and over 70 video interviews. A sister project on gender identity and transgender experiences titled "Journeys of Faith" was launched in 2015.

See also 
Mormons Building Bridges Group
Affirmation Group
Evergreen International

References

External links 
 
 Voices of Hope official website
 North Star's Facebook page

LGBT Latter Day Saint organizations
Online support groups